Felix Reda (formerly Julia Reda; born 30 November 1986) is a German researcher and politician who was Member of the European Parliament (MEP) from Germany. He was a member of the Pirate Party Germany until 27 March 2019, part of The Greens–European Free Alliance. He has been Vice-President of the Greens/EFA group since 2014. He was also previously the president of Young Pirates of Europe. After the 2019 European Parliament election Reda was succeeded by Patrick Breyer (Pirate Party Germany), Marcel Kolaja, Markéta Gregorová, and Mikuláš Peksa (Czech Pirate Party).

In 2019 Reda became a fellow at the Berkman Klein Center for Internet & Society at Harvard.

Political career 
Reda became a member of the centre-left Social Democratic Party of Germany when he was 16 years old. He studied politics and publicity sciences at the University of Mainz. In 2009, Reda started to become active for the national Pirate Party and from 2010 to 2012 he was chairperson of the Young Pirates. In 2013, he was one of the co-founders of the Young Pirates of Europe. In January 2014, he was chosen to top the list of the candidates for the European Elections for the Pirate Party Germany, who subsequently won one seat.

In the European Parliament, Reda joined the Greens/EFA group. He was a member of the Legal Affairs committee as well as a substitute member of the Internal Market and Consumer Protection and Petitions committees. He was on the Steering Committee of the Digital Agenda intergroup, a forum of MEPs interested in digital issues.

On 27 March 2019, he announced in an online video that he had left the Pirate Party, protesting the fact that his former employee Gilles Bordelais had been admitted as a candidate in the European elections while being under investigation for sexual harassment.

Copyright reform 
In 2014, Reda said that copyright reform would be his focus for the legislative term.

In November 2014, Reda was named rapporteur of the Parliament's review of 2001's Copyright Directive. His draft report recommended the EU-wide harmonisation of copyright exceptions, a reduction in term length, broad exceptions for educational purposes and a strengthening of authors' negotiating position in relation to publishers, among other measures.

Stakeholder reaction varied as the German artist coalition  generally welcomed the draft while the French collecting society  said it was "unacceptable"; author and copyright activist Cory Doctorow called the proposals "amazingly sensible", while former Swedish Pirate MEP Amelia Andersdotter criticised them as too conservative.

In 2015, Reda's report was passed by the legal affairs committee, but with an amendment that recommended restricting freedom of panorama in Europe. Reda strongly opposed this amendment and campaigned against it. The amendment was later voted down by the plenary of the European Parliament.

In 2019, Reda was described as a leader in the protests against Article 13 (colloquially called the "upload filter" provision) of the proposed EU Copyright Directive, in which 100,000 people participated in street demonstrations on March 23, 2019.

Personal life 
On 26 January 2022, Reda announced that he is transgender and now uses the first name Felix.

References

External links 

 
Member profile on the website of the European Parliament

1986 births
Living people
MEPs for Germany 2014–2019
Pirate Party (Germany) MEPs
Politicians from Bonn
Transgender politicians
LGBT MEPs for Germany
21st-century LGBT people
Transgender men
Transgender academics